China Is Near is a 1967 Italian drama film written and directed by Marco Bellocchio. It is a satirical movie about the struggle for political and social power.

Plot
Gordini Malvezzi is a family of the Romagna gentry. The nuclear family is composed of siblings Elena, Vittorio, and Camillo. Countess Elena is an attractive middle-aged woman who plays the part of a matriarch and indulges herself in sexual relationships with common men of the town but avoids further rapport because she is afraid they are just after her money. Count Vittorio is a secularist professor who has pursued fruitless efforts to launch a political career. On the other hand, Camillo is a seventeen-year-old seminary student who is in constant struggle with his aristocratic background and Catholic upbringing and finds a symbolic revolt in adopting a hardline Maoist political line.

Vittorio is in love with his accountant-secretary Giovanna but, although sympathetic with him, repelled by Vittorio's meek and impotent attitude, she rejects his advances and runs a relationship with Carlo, the young and ambitious accountant who also happens to be the treasurer of the local Unified Socialist Party branch. Carlo makes a plan to marry into the rich landed gentry through Elena and the party offers Vittorio a candidacy for the local administration elections. When Vittorio eventually drops his restrained support to Camillo's 'organisation' for the sake of his socialist candidacy, Camillo starts to subversively target his brother's campaign.

Cast
 Glauco Mauri as Vittorio
 Elda Tattoli as Elena
 Paolo Graziosi as Carlo
 Daniela Surina as Giovanna
 Pierluigi Aprà as Camillo
 Alessandro Haber as Rospo
 Claudio Trionfi as Giacomo
 Laura De Marchi as Clotilde
 Claudio Cassinelli as Furio
 Rossano Jalenti
 Mimma Biscardi

Critical response
The film was warmly reviewed by Pauline Kael in The New Yorker on its release: " China Is Near has the boudoir complications of a classic comic opera...Bellochio uses the underside of family life for borderline horror and humor. His people are so awful they're funny...[Bellochio]..only twenty-eight - perhaps only a very young director can focus on such graceless, mean-spirited people with so much enjoyment..he probably exhibits the most fluid directorial technique since Max Ophuls.." The film was selected as the Italian entry for the Best Foreign Language Film at the 40th Academy Awards, but was not accepted as a nominee.

See also
 List of submissions to the 40th Academy Awards for Best Foreign Language Film
 List of Italian submissions for the Academy Award for Best Foreign Language Film

References

External links 
 

1967 films
1967 drama films
Italian drama films
Italian satirical films
1960s Italian-language films
Films directed by Marco Bellocchio
Italian black-and-white films
Italian political satire films
Films scored by Ennio Morricone
Films set in Emilia-Romagna
Venice Grand Jury Prize winners
1960s Italian films